A provincial-controlled division, is an unofficial designation for a type of administrative division of China. Every provincial-controlled divisions is officially considered to be a county-level city or county, but it has more power de facto because it is directly under the province similar to prefectural-level divisions.

List of provincial-controlled divisions

Hubei
 Tianmen
 Xiantao
 Qianjiang
 Shennongjia

Henan
 Jiyuan
 Gongyi
 Ruzhou
 Dengzhou
 Yongcheng
 Huaxian (county)
 Changyuan County
 Lankao County
 Gushi County
 Luyi County
 Xincai County

Xinjiang
Note: all cities are governed by the Xinjiang Production and Construction Corps (XPCC, Bintuan)
 Shihezi
 Aral
 Tumxuk
 Wujiaqu
 Beitun
 Tiemenguan
 Shuanghe

Jilin
 Gongzhuling
 Meihekou

Liaoning
 Suizhong County
 Changtu County

Gansu
 Dunhuang
 Yumen

Hebei
 Dingzhou
 Xinji

Heilongjiang
 Suifenhe
 Fuyuan County

Guizhou
 Renhuai
 Weining County

Anhui
 Guangde County
 Susong County

Guangxi
 Cenxi
 Guiping
 Pingxiang
 Wuming County
 Liujiang County
 Xing'an County
 Yangshuo County
 Rongxian (county)
 Debao County
 Du'an County

Jiangsu
 Kunshan
 Taixing
 Shuyang County

Shandong
 Laiyang
 Anqiu
 Rongcheng
 Shanghe County
 Gaoqing County
 Jinxiang County
 Sishui County
 Tancheng County
 Pingyi County
 Ningyang County
 Shenxian (county)
 Guanxian (county)
 Caoxian (county)
 Juancheng County
 Xiajin County
 Qingyun County
 Huimin County
 Yangxin County
 Lijin County
 Juxian (county)

Guangdong
 Shunde District
 Yangchun
 Gaozhou
 Yingde
 Puning
 Luoding
 Nanxiong
 Xingning
 Longchuan County
 Wuhua County
 Boluo County
 Xuwen County
 Raoping County
 Zijin County
 Fengkai County

Jiangxi
 Gongqingcheng
 Ruijin
 Fengcheng
 Poyang County
 Anfu County
 Nancheng County

Administrative divisions of China
Sub
County-level divisions of the People's Republic of China